Reza Karimi may refer to:
 Reza Karimi (artist) (born 1946), Iranian born painter/artist living in New York
 Reza Karimi (footballer) (born 1998), Iranian footballer 
 Reza Karimi (politician), Iranian politician and agricultural engineer
 Reza Mirkarimi (born 1967), Iranian film director